, sometimes styled VALKYRIE in capitals, was a  women's mixed martial arts (MMA) promotion. It was the sister of Japanese MMA promotion Cage Force, both operated by Greatest Common Multiple (GCM) Communication. Contrary to other Japanese women MMA promotions at the time, it featured a cage instead of a ring and used the same venues as Cage Force.

History
Takeshi Nagao, a former Smackgirl executive, and Yasuko Mogi were appointed as producers. Mogi announced several details of the promotion, such as the weight classes and the rules, which would be essentially the same as those used in Cage Force, and also that former Smackgirl Lightweight Champion Yuka Tsuji would participate in the promotion in a match against Mei Yamaguchi. Other matches would be announced at later dates. As part of its business strategy, Valkyrie events were held before Cage Force, in this way sharing venue, cage and other resources.

The next Valkyrie event, title Cage Force & Valkyrie, was co-promoted with Cage Force and featured three female bouts. Mei Yamaguchi won the tournament to become the next challenger for the featherweight title.

Due to an injury, Yuka Tsuji would be unable to defend her title against Mei Yamaguchi, so it was decided to postpone that match for another event. Due to this, Yasuko Mogi stepped up to fight again against Misaki Takimoto in the main bout. Future Jewels featherweight champion Naho Sugiyama debuted professionally in this event.

On  Valkyrie 04 was held. The event featured as the main bout Yuka Tsuji against Mei Yamaguchi for the featherweight title as well as the first round of the flyweight tournament to crown the first champion of the promotion. In a big upset in the history of women's MMA, Yamaguchi defeated Tsuji in the first round of their match, becoming the featherweight champion, and giving Tsuji her second professional defeat and the first since 2003.

A few days before the event, Ayame Miura got injured and was replaced by Megumi Yabushita. Yabushita and Kyoko Takabayashi, who defeated standout Emi Fujino, were the more notable winners of the event.

On , Valkyrie 06 was held. During the event, future star Rin Nakai beat seasoned veteran Megumi Yabushita and in the flyweight tournament final Yasuko Tamada defeated Naoko Omuro to become Valkyrie's first champion in that weight.

Rin Nakai and Mizuho Sato advanced to the final of the tournament.

For the next event of the promotion, Valkyrie 08, Rin Nakai and Mizuho Sato were set to fight for Valkyrie openweight title and Mei Yamaguchi would fight against Kyoko Takabayashi to defend Valkyrie featherweight title. On  the event took place, with Nakai becoming the openweight champion and Yamaguchi barely defending the featherweight title with a majority draw in a very controversial decision. Also notably, Naho Sugiyama defeated flyweight champion Yasuko Tamada in a non-title bout.

After the Jewels vs. Valkyrie theme in Jewels 13th Ring & 14th Ring, followed also in Jewels 15th Ring, and due to the lack of Valkyrie events, fighters from the Valkyrie promotion started joining rival Japanese promotion Jewels. Some of them had already participated in other MMA promotions already.

On , members of Wajyutsu Keisyukai announced the formation of a new players association to separate themselves from GCM Communication and its president Toyoki Kubo due to the lack of activity of GCM Communication which had not held any new MMA event since  and had not paid storage fees and other payments. A few weeks later, at Jewels 17th Ring on  Yasuko Mogi became the matchmaker of Jewels and this effectively meant the end for the Valkyrie promotion.

Rules
Generally speaking, the rules were based on Cage Force rules, which in turn were similar to the Unified Rules of Mixed Martial Arts, minus elbow strikes to the head and no ground-and-pound in amateur bouts. With respect to the length of matches, regular bouts were three three-minute rounds and title bouts were three five-minute rounds.

Weight classes
These were the official weight classes used by the promotion.

Valkyrie events

Champions

See also
Cage Force

References

External links
 
Official blog (old) 

2008 establishments in Japan
2011 disestablishments in Japan
Mixed martial arts organizations
Organizations established in 2008
Organizations disestablished in 2011
Women's mixed martial arts